Alessandra Carbone is an  Italian mathematician and computer scientist. She is a professor in the computer science department of the Pierre and Marie Curie University. Since 2009 she has headed the laboratory of computational and quantitative biology. This laboratory studies the function and evolution of biological systems. She is a senior member of the Institut Universitaire de France and received the Irène Joliot-Curie Prize in 2010.

Career 
She gained her PhD in mathematics in 1993 at the City University of New York, supervised by Rohit Jivanlal Parikh, after which she took up a post doctoral post at the Paris Diderot University until 1995 when she took a position at the Technical University of Vienna until 1996. She has taught computer science at the Paris 12 Val de Marne University and the Institut des Hautes Études Scientifiques. She is currently a professor at the Pierre and Marie Curie University

Research into muscular dystrophy 
The project uses cloud computing facilitated by the World Community Grid to enable the large amount of calculations necessary.

Other awards 

References

Year of birth missing (living people)
Living people
Italian mathematicians
Italian women computer scientists
Women mathematicians
Recipients of the Legion of Honour
City University of New York alumni